Saint-Macaire-en-Mauges is a former commune in the Maine-et-Loire department in western France. Since 2015, it is the seat of the commune of Sèvremoine.

History 
On 15 December 2015, Le Longeron, Montfaucon-Montigné, La Renaudière, Roussay, Saint-André-de-la-Marche, Saint-Crespin-sur-Moine, Saint-Germain-sur-Moine, Saint-Macaire-en-Mauges, Tillières and Torfou merged becoming one commune called Sèvremoine.

See also
Communes of the Maine-et-Loire department

References

External links

Official Web site

Saintmacaireenmauges